Ana María Desivici Nekeforchuk (born 8 November 1955) is a Uruguayan athlete. She competed in the women's pentathlon at the 1976 Summer Olympics.

References

1955 births
Living people
Athletes (track and field) at the 1975 Pan American Games
Athletes (track and field) at the 1976 Summer Olympics
Uruguayan pentathletes
Olympic athletes of Uruguay
Pan American Games competitors for Uruguay
Place of birth missing (living people)